Saint Francis Memorial Hospital is an accredited, not-for-profit community hospital that has been operating in San Francisco since the early twentieth century. Saint Francis Memorial is a member of Dignity Health, now part of CommonSpirit Health.

Located atop Nob Hill, Saint Francis is home to the Bothin Burn Center, largest burn center in Northern California, the Saint Francis Orthopedic and Sports Medicine Institute[1] and Sports Medicine Institute[1] and Sports Medicine Institute, and the Gender Institute, which delivers compassionate, high quality, affordable health services to transgender patients and their families.

History
Founded in 1905 in San Francisco by five physicians, they undertook to build "the most up-to-date modern hospital west of Chicago."

Timeline of Saint Francis Memorial Hospital

1905: Saint Francis Hospital Company is founded by five physicians.

1906: The Great earthquake of 1906 causes a fire that burns the hospital to the ground. Dr. Redmond Payne volunteers his home to become the temporary location for Saint Francis.

1911: A new 100-bed building is built at the corner of Bush and Hyde streets, which is the present Nob Hill address, and is fully occupied within 10 days of opening.

1921: To accommodate the post-war baby boom, a 200-bed obstetrics wing is added.

1938: The for-profit Saint Francis Hospital Company becomes the non-profit Saint Francis Hospital Association.

1952: The Plastic & Reconstructive Surgery Clinic and Residency Program is established.

1955: A four-bed burn ward opens. Occupational Therapy and Social Services are added for the benefit of the community.

1965: Groundbreaking for the new tower takes place.

1967: The Bothin Burn Center opens as a 10-bed acute care ward.

1979: The Center for Sports Medicine is opened.

1984: $3.5 million is raised for major hospital renovations.

1986: The Healthwise Senior Program is started and serves the senior citizens of San Francisco.

1990: Saint Francis becomes the first hospital in the San Francisco/Bay Area to perform Laser Gall Bladder Surgery. The HIVCare Program is established. The Centers for Excellence adds an Oncology Center and a Spine Center.

1993: Saint Francis becomes a member of Dignity Health.

1999: Dignity and Saint Francis become the Official Health Care Provider of the San Francisco Giants.

2000: Saint Francis opens The Health Center at the old SBC Park.

2001: The Total Joint Center opens.

2002: One of the top scores within the Dignity Hospital System, Saint Francis receives a score of 94 during the JCAHO/CALS survey.

2003: The Hospital installs the Picture archiving and communication System (PACS) in the Radiology Department, one of the newest systems.

2004:  The Behavioral Health Day Unit and the San Francisco Center for Wound Healing begin operations.

2005: The Center for Sports Medicine opens a new satellite center in Corte Madera at the Town Center.

A satellite Center for Sports Medicine is added to the new AT&T Park and a third center is opened in Walnut Creek, Ca.

See also
List of hospitals in California 
Dignity Health

References

External links
Saint Francis Memorial Hospital
Hospital History
This hospital in the CA Healthcare Atlas A project by OSHPD

Hospital buildings completed in 1911
Hospital buildings completed in 1921
Hospital buildings completed in 1967
Dignity Health
Hospitals in San Francisco
Christian hospitals
1911 establishments in California